Jamie Orchard is a Canadian journalist. She is the host and news anchor for Global Montreal's weekday evening news program.

She was born and raised in the Montreal suburb of Brossard, Quebec.  She graduated from Concordia University.

References

External links
 Global Montreal Bio
 

Year of birth missing (living people)
People from Brossard
Living people
Canadian television news anchors
Anglophone Quebec people
Journalists from Montreal
Canadian women television journalists
Global Television Network people